The following lists events that happened during 2000 in Laos.

Incumbents
President: Khamtai Siphandon
Vice President: 
Prime Minister: Sisavath Keobounphanh

Events

July
3 July - Vang Tao Incident

References

 
Years of the 20th century in Laos
Laos
2000s in Laos
Laos